The 1985–86 Minnesota Strikers season of the Major Indoor Soccer League  was the second season of the team in the indoor league, and the club's nineteenth season in professional soccer.  This year, the team finished second in the Eastern Division of the regular season.  They made it to the playoffs and the MISL Championship Series.  They were this year's Runners-up.

Background

Review

Competitions

MISL regular season 

Playoff teams in bold.

Results summaries

Results by round

Match reports

MISL Playoffs

Quarterfinals

Semifinals

Championship Series

Bracket

Match reports

Statistics

Transfers

References 

Minnesota Strikers seasons
Minnesota Strikers
Minnesota Strikers
Minnesota Strikers